Edwige Gwend (born 11 March 1990) is a Cameroonean-born Italian judoka who competes in the 63 kg division. She won an individual silver medal at the 2010 European Championships, and was eliminated in the second round at the 2012 and 2016 Olympics.

Gwend immigrated from Cameroon to Italy when she was three years old. In November 2015 she was named Athlete of the Month by the city of Parma.

References

External links

 
 
 

Italian female judoka
Living people
Olympic judoka of Italy
Judoka at the 2012 Summer Olympics
Judoka at the 2016 Summer Olympics
Cameroonian emigrants to Italy
Italian sportspeople of African descent
1990 births
Sportspeople from Parma
People from Littoral Region (Cameroon)
European Games bronze medalists for Italy
European Games medalists in judo
Judoka at the 2015 European Games
Judoka at the 2019 European Games
Competitors at the 2018 Mediterranean Games
Mediterranean Games gold medalists for Italy
Mediterranean Games medalists in judo